Alvin Richardson (February 1, 1935 – December 6, 1977) was an American football player who played with the Boston Patriots. He played college football at Grambling State University.

References

1935 births
1977 deaths
American football defensive ends
Boston Patriots players
Grambling State Tigers football players
Players of American football from New Orleans